The 2011–12 season was East Fife's fourth consecutive season in the Scottish Second Division, having been promoted from the Scottish Third Division at the end of the 2007–08 season. East Fife also competed in the Challenge Cup, League Cup and the Scottish Cup.

Summary
East Fife finished sixth in the Second Division. They reached the Quarter-final of the Challenge Cup, the Quarter-final of the League Cup and the fourth round of the Scottish Cup.

Management
They began the 2011–12 season under the management of John Robertson. On 1 March 2012, Robertson was sacked with Gordon Durie being appointed as caretaker manager. On 11 March, he was made manager on a permanent basis with Gordon Chisholm being appointed as his assistant.

Results & fixtures

Pre season

Scottish Second Division

Scottish Cup

Scottish League Cup

Scottish Challenge Cup

Fife cup

Player statistics

Squad 
Last updated 6 May 2012

|}

Disciplinary record
Includes all competitive matches.
Last updated 6 May 2012

Awards

Last updated 4 May 2012

Team statistics

League table

Transfers

Players in

Players out

References

East Fife
East Fife F.C. seasons
East Fife F.C.